The sixteenth season of the Case Closed anime was directed by Masato Satō and produced by TMS Entertainment and Yomiuri Telecasting Corporation. The series is based on Gosho Aoyama's Case Closed manga series. In Japan, the series is titled  but was changed due to legal issues with the title Detective Conan. The episodes' plot follows Conan Edogawa's daily adventures.

The episodes use six pieces of theme music: three opening themes and three ending themes.

The season initially ran from February 26, 2007 through December 3, 2007 on Nippon Television Network System in Japan. Episodes 466 to 490 were later collected into eight DVD compilations by Shogakukan. They were released between January 25, 2008 and August 22, 2008 in Japan.


Episode list

Volume DVDs
Shogakukan released eight DVD compilations of the seventeenth season between January 25, 2008 and August 22, 2008 in Japan.

Notes and references
Notes
 The episode's numbering as followed in Japan
 The episodes were aired as a single hour long episode in Japan
 The episodes were aired as a single two-hour long episode in Japan

References

2007 Japanese television seasons
Season16